is a Japanese footballer. He currently plays as a futsal player for Fortuna Düsseldorf.

Career statistics

Club

Notes

References

1995 births
Living people
Association football people from Ibaraki Prefecture
Japanese footballers
Japanese men's futsal players
Association football midfielders
Singapore Premier League players
Albirex Niigata Singapore FC players
Japanese expatriate footballers
Japanese expatriate sportspeople in Singapore
Expatriate footballers in Singapore
Japanese expatriate sportspeople in Germany
Expatriate footballers in Germany